Kelly Miller Smith Sr. (October 28, 1920 – June 3, 1984) was a Baptist preacher, author, and prominent activist in the Civil Rights Movement, who was based in Nashville, Tennessee.

Early life
Smith was born and raised in the all-black community of Mound Bayou, Mississippi. He attended Tennessee Agricultural and Industrial State College (later Tennessee State University) from 1938 to 1940, but graduated from Morehouse College in Atlanta in 1942 with a double major in music and religion.  He later received a Bachelor of Divinity degree (now known as a Master of Divinity degree) from Howard University School of Religion in 1945.

Career
Smith moved to Nashville, Tennessee, in 1951 where he became pastor of First Baptist Church, Capitol Hill, a post he would retain until his death in 1984. He became president of the Nashville NAACP in 1956 and founded the Nashville Christian Leadership Council (NCLC) in 1958. Through the NCLC, Smith helped to organize and support the Nashville sit-ins—a movement which would successfully end racial segregation at lunch counters in Nashville. In a 1964 interview with Robert Penn Warren for the book Who Speaks for the Negro?, Smith comments that the end to segregation was achieved through much hardship and many negotiations by the NCLC.

In 1969, Smith became assistant dean of the Vanderbilt University Divinity School. He was the first African American to become a faculty member in the school.

Personal life and death
Smith was married to Alice Clark Smith and had four children, daughters Joy Ardelia, Adena Modesta, and Valerie Lin, and son Kelly Miller Smith Jr. He and his wife also reared a foster daughter Dorothy Jean Springfield.

Smith died of cancer on June 3, 1984. He was buried in Greenwood Cemetery in Nashville.

Legacy and honors
The Kelly Miller Smith Memorial Bridge and Kelly Smith Towers in Nashville are named for him.
After his death Vanderbilt University named The Kelly Miller Smith Institute on Black Church Studies at the Divinity School in his memory. The Institute perpetuates his legacy of theological and academic excellence and prophetic witness.
 Kelly Miller Smith interviews housed in the website Who Speaks for the Negro? hosted by Robert Penn Warren Center for the Humanities at Vanderbilt University. The  website is a digital archive of materials related to the book of the same name published by Robert Penn Warren in 1965. The original materials are held at the University of Kentucky and Yale University Libraries.  The archive consists of digitized versions of the original reel-to-reel recordings that Warren compiled for each of his interviewees as well as print materials related to the project. Digital archive created and designed by the Robert Penn Warren Center for the Humanities at Vanderbilt University.
 The Kelly Miller Smith Papers housed at Vanderbilt Library in Special Collections, include his sermons, private correspondence, as well as Smith's musical compositions and other papers. A Finding Aid is available for this collection and the later Kelly Miller Smith Papers Addition.
 The city of Nashville (Tennessee) renamed a street Kelly Miller Smith Way (formerly 10th Circle) in memory of Kelly Miller Smith Sr. in July 2021.

Selected works
Microphone Messages (1947)
A Doorway to Bible Appreciation (1948)

References

1920 births
1984 deaths
People from Mound Bayou, Mississippi
People from Nashville, Tennessee
Vanderbilt University faculty
African-American Baptist ministers
Activists for African-American civil rights
African-American activists
Baptists from Tennessee
Baptists from Mississippi
Morehouse College alumni
20th-century Baptist ministers from the United States